The Horace Estes House is a historic house at 614 East Main Street in Gurdon, Arkansas.  It is a single-story structure with a wood frame and brick veneer exterior.  It was built in 1934, and is the city's best example of Tudor Revival architecture, featuring an irregular plan, multiple gables in the roofline, a tall ornamental chimney, and narrow windows.

The house was listed on the National Register of Historic Places in 1993.

See also
National Register of Historic Places listings in Clark County, Arkansas

References

Houses on the National Register of Historic Places in Arkansas
Tudor Revival architecture in Arkansas
Houses completed in 1934
Houses in Clark County, Arkansas
National Register of Historic Places in Clark County, Arkansas
1934 establishments in Arkansas